Rauheck is a mountain of Bavaria, Germany.

Climbing routes 

Four paths lead to the summit:
via the Oytal over the Älplesattel,
via the Dietersbachtal, also over the Älplesattel,
via the Eissee above the Käseralp
and
via the Kreuzeck.

References 

Mountains of Bavaria
Allgäu Alps
Mountains of the Alps